The 2014 Ulster Senior Football Championship was the 126th installment of the annual Ulster Senior Football Championship held under the auspices of Ulster GAA. It was one of the four provincial competitions of the 2014 All-Ireland Senior Football Championship. Monaghan entered the competition as defending Ulster champions. They were dethroned by Donegal in the final.

The draw was made on 3 October 2013. Under new GAA rules, to allow counties to more easily predict the dates of their qualifier matches, the two sides of the draw were named as either A or B. Antrim, Derry, Donegal and Fermanagh were named on the A side of the draw, while Armagh, Cavan, Down, Monaghan and Tyrone's draw was named as the B side.

The opening game of the Ulster Championship was played on 18 May 2014, with Tyrone playing Down at Healy Park. The game ended level and the teams faced each other again the following week, with Tyrone advancing to the quarter-finals. In the first of the quarter-finals on 25 May 2014, Derry were beaten by Donegal, the Oak Leaf county losing by a goal in their home ground of Celtic Park. In the second quarter-final, which took place on 1 June 2014, Antrim narrowly beat Fermanagh, seeing the Saffrons through to their first Ulster semi-final since 2009.

A mass player brawl before kick-off marred the quarter-final meeting of Armagh and Cavan at the Athletic Grounds on 8 June 2014, with Cavan's star player Martin Dunne unable to play and his team losing by a goal and three points. Dunne sustained a broken hand and was seen watching the game with his arm in a sling. Reigning Ulster champions Monaghan overcame Tyrone by a single point on 15 June 2014, to earn the chance to face Armagh.

In the first semi-final on 22 June 2014, Antrim were beaten comfortably by Donegal with the total difference between the teams at full-time being 13 points. The second semi-final was much closer, the match between Armagh and Monaghan on 28 June 2014 ending level. In the replay on 6 July 2014, Monaghan were five-point victors, setting up a final against Donegal, a replay of the previous year's final.

The final took place on 20 July 2014. Having led 0-06 to 0-04 at half-time, Donegal won the match by three point on 0-15 to 1-09 scoreline, avenging the previous year's defeat to Monaghan in the final.

Teams
The Ulster championship is contested by the nine county teams in the province of Ulster.

Bracket

Fixtures

Preliminary round

Quarter-finals

Semi-finals

Final

See also
 Fixtures and results
 2014 All-Ireland Senior Football Championship
 2014 Connacht Senior Football Championship
 2014 Leinster Senior Football Championship
 2014 Munster Senior Football Championship

References

2U
2014 in Northern Ireland sport
Ulster Senior Football Championship